Björkhagen metro station is on the green line of the Stockholm metro, located in Björkhagen, Söderort. The station was inaugurated on 18 November 1958 as a part of the extension from Hammarbyhöjden to Bagarmossen.

References

Green line (Stockholm metro) stations
Railway stations opened in 1958